Jasanoff is a surname. Notable people with the surname include:

Jay Jasanoff (born 1942), American linguist
Maya Jasanoff (born 1974), American historian
Sheila Jasanoff (born 1944), Indian-born American social scientist

Ashkenazi surnames